Uromastyx shobraki is a species of agamid lizard. It is found in Yemen.

References

Uromastyx
Reptiles described in 2007
Taxa named by Thomas Wilms
Taxa named by Andreas Schmitz